Bematistes scalivittata is a butterfly in the family Nymphalidae. It is found in Tanzania, Malawi and Zambia.

Description
. 
 P. scalivittata Btlr. (58 d) is very similar to  aganice, only differing in the narrow white transverse band of the forewing consisting of two broadly separated parts; one part is placed at the middle of the costal margin and is composed of 5 small spots in cellules 4-6, 10 and 11; the other part only consists of two spots in cellules 2 and 3, placed vertically to the hindmargin and only 2-4mm. from the distal margin; the two divisions of the transverse band are thus about 3 mm. apart at vein 4. Nyassaland.

Subspecies
Bematistes scalivittata scalivittata (eastern Zambia, northern Malawi, possibly western Tanzania)
Bematistes scalivittata kiellandianus Koçak, 1996 (central, southern and south-western Tanzania)

Biology
The habitat consists of montane forests.

The larvae feed on Adenia species, including A. stolzii.

Taxonomy
See Pierre & Bernaud, 2014

References

External links
Die Gross-Schmetterlinge der Erde 13: Die Afrikanischen Tagfalter. Plate XIII 58 d
Images representing  Acraea scalivittata at Bold

Butterflies described in 1896
Acraeini
Butterflies of Africa
Taxa named by Arthur Gardiner Butler